The Théâtre ChoChotte was inaugurated in 1986 by Madame Caussade, who was an artist and an entrepreneur, and also a designer of haute couture whose shop was located at the current address of the theater. Since it was created, the theatre has always been a Parisian erotic performance hall located at 34 rue Saint-André-des-Arts, in the 6th arrondissement of Paris.

History 
Until 1986, the ChoChotte theater hall was a haute couture shop in which Madame Caussade used to receive her customers.

After having spent her entire career dressing women with her creations, Madame Caussade decided, from 1986, to offer her customers, and women in general, a place no longer to come and dress, but to undress, and thus she transformed her shop into a performance hall in which new erotic shows are created every week.

The establishment has been the subject of media reports.

Written press 
 April 2019: Press article in the French magazine entitled Paris Nuit
 February 2017: Les déesses de la fesse, press article in the French magazine entitled Soixante-Quinze
 2017: Théâtre Chochotte, press article in the French magazine entitled TéléObs Paris Dernière
 June 2003: Ma nuit chez Chochotte, press article in the French magazine entitled Senso n°9 published in May/June 2003
 2012:  Dossier Chochotte, press article in the French magazine L'imparfaite n°4 published in summer 2012
 February 2008: press article in the French magazine entitled France NewsDigest n°849 published on 7 February 2008
 Art book entitled Paris Derrière – Les clés de l'érotisme à Paris dedicated to the ChoChotte theater

TV broadcast 
 10 May 2014: Broadcast entitled Spectacle érotique chez Chochotte in TV report entitled Paris Dernière broadcast on Paris Première French TV channel 
 13 December 2014: Broadcast entitled Soirée érotique et burlesque au théâtre Chochotte in TV report entitled Paris Dernière broadcast on Paris Première French TV channel 
 23 November 2007: TV show entitled Paris Dernière n°9(5) broadcast on Paris Première French TV channel, Season n°10
 Que se passe-t-il la nuit ?, TV report entitled Je t’aime etc. broadcast on France 2 French TV channel 
 5 December 2002: TV report entitled L'Oeil de Zara
 21 September 2001: TV report entitled L'Oeil de Zara
 26 December 2000: TV show entitled Hot talk n°132 broadcast on XXL French TV channel
 8 June 1996: TV show entitled Paris Dernière n°37 broadcast on Paris Première French TV channel 
 23 December 1995: TV show entitled Paris Dernière n°13 broadcast on Paris Première French TV channel
 TV report entitled Combien ça coûte presented by Jean-Pierre Pernaut

External links 
 
 Official website of the Tourist and Congress Office in Paris, with a dedicated page to the ChoChotte theater on parisinfo.com
 Les adresses insolites de Paris Dernière (The amazing addresses of Paris Dernière) on vogue.fr, 17 November 2016
 Défi Saint-Valentin. 7 jours pour monter au 7e Ciel ((Valentine's Day challenge. 7 days to climb to 7th Heaven)) sur leparisien.fr, 27 January 2018
 EROS FEMINA Festival: 4 artistes qui font dans l'érotisme à découvrir (4 artists who evolve in eroticism to discover) on rtl.fr, 13 June 2018
 Que faire à Paris quand on est culotté(e) ? sur quefaire.paris.fr

References 

Theatres in Paris
6th arrondissement of Paris
1986 establishments in France
Cabarets in Paris
Performing arts
Nightlife in Paris
Erotica
Erotic art